Hen 2-131 is a planetary nebula in the southern constellation of Apus. It was discovered by Andrew David Thackeray in 1950 and added to the Catalogues of Hα-emission Stars and Nebulae in the Magellanic Clouds by Karl Gordon Henize in 1967.

Hen 2-131 is about 2,200 pc from earth. HD 138403 is the star located in the center of Hen 2–131 with a spectral type of O8(f)ep. HD 138403 is suspected of variability, possibly by 0.1 to 0.15 magnitudes over a period of several hours. This nebula is similar to IC 418, IC 4593 and Hen 2-138.

References

Hen 2-131
Hen 2-131
Emission-line stars
O-type stars